Aeschynanthus fulgens is an Asian species of plants in the family Gesneriaceae and tribe Trichosporeae, with no subspecies listed in the Catalogue of Life.  A common name for this and similar species in the genus is "lipstick vine"; its name in Vietnamese is má dào Everard.

The plant is a trailing epiphyte, with orange-red flowers approximately 70 mm long and slightly pubescent.

References

External links 

Flora of Indo-China
Epiphytes
fulgens